Orchestra Super Mazembe was a popular band based in Kenya playing Lingala (Soukous) music. The band had roots in Super Vox, a band formed in 1967 in Zaire and led by Nashil Pichen Kazembe, Mutonkole Longwa Didos. The band moved to Nairobi in 1974 and changed its name to Orchestra Super Mazembe.

Their biggest hit was "Shauri Yako", a cover song originally performed by Nguashi Ntimbo and Festival Du Zaire. Other popular songs included "Samba", "Bwana Nipe Pesa" and "Kassongo". The group was disbanded in 1985.

Super Mazembe is considered one of the golden era of Kenyan Lingala music acts alongside Les Mangelepa, Baba Gaston and Samba Mapangala.

Band members 
Like many East African and Congolese groups, Super Mazembe experienced constant line-up changes.

Original lineup:
Lovy Longomba (vocals) - Left the band in 1981 and formed groups "Super Lovy" and later "Bana Likasi". He died in 1996. Lovy is son of Vicky Longomba and brother of Awilo Longomba, both famous Congolese musicians. Lovy's sons Christian (deceased) and Lovi formed  Longombas, a popular hip hop group in Kenya.
Kassongo wa Kanema (vocals) -Left the band in the early 80's and joined Orchestra Virunga - died 2020.
Atia Jo (Frederick Mulunguluke Mwanza) (bass guitar) -Died 2006
Bukasa wa Bukasa "Bukalos" (lead guitar) -Died 1989'
Rapok Kayembe Miketo (guitar) -Died 1991Komba Kassongo Songoley (guitar) -Died 1990Mutonkole Longwa Didos (vocals)-Died 1999Fataki Lokassa -deceased
Lobe Mapako "pasi" -Guitar -deceased
Tailos -deceased
Dodo Doris (drums) - deceased in June 2020

Some of the later members:
Loboko Bua Mangala (guitar)
Kilambe Katele Aley (vocals)
Mwanza wa Mwanza Mulunguluke (bass guitar)
Kitenge Ngoi wa Kitombole (drums)
Musa Olokwiso Mangala
Rondo Wa Kandolo -Vocals

Discography

AlbumsMazembe (1980)10th Anniversary (1981)Double Gold (1982)Kaivaska (1982) — Virgin RecordsWabe-Aba (1984)

CompilationsTheir Greatest Hits (1986)Maloba D' Amor (1990) — DiscAfriqueHits of Mazembe vol. 4Giants of East Africa'' (2001) — Earthworks/Stern's Music

References

External links 

congo in kenya
 

Kenyan musical groups
1974 establishments in Kenya
1967 establishments in the Democratic Republic of the Congo